The 2007 Artois Championships, also known as the Queen's Club Championships, was a men's tennis tournament that was part of the International Series of the 2007 ATP Tour. It was the 104th edition of the event and was held on outdoor grass courts at the Queen's Club in London, United Kingdom, from 11 June until 17 June 2007. Second-seeded Andy Roddick won the singles title, his fourth win at the event after 2003, 2004 and 2005.

Finals

Singles

 Andy Roddick defeated  Nicolas Mahut 4–6, 7–6(9–7), 7–6(7–2)
 It was Roddick's 1st singles title of the year and the 22nd of his career.

Doubles

 Mark Knowles /  Daniel Nestor defeated  Bob Bryan /  Mike Bryan 7–6(7–4), 7–5

Juniors
 Uladzimir Ignatik defeated  Gastão Elias 7–5, 6–0

References

External links
 Official website Queen's Club Championships 
 The Queen's Club website
 ATP tournament profile

 
Stella Artois Championships
Queen's Club Championships
Stella Artois Championships
Stella Artois Championships
Stella Artois Championships